Trimerotropini is a tribe of band-winged grasshoppers in the family Acrididae. There are at least 70 described species in Trimerotropini: found in the western Americas.

Genera
These genera belong to the tribe Trimerotropini:
 Circotettix Scudder, 1876
 Conozoa Saussure, 1884
 Dissosteira Scudder, 1876
 Spharagemon Scudder, 1875
 Trimerotropis Stål, 1873

References

Further reading

 
 
 

Oedipodinae